Aleksey Kirillovich Alchevsky (Ukrainian: Олексій Кирилович Алчевський, romanized: Oleksii Kyrylovych Alchevskyi; 1835, Sumy, Russian Empire – 1901, St. Petersburg, Russian Empire) was a Ukrainian entrepreneur during Russian empire, philanthropist, and industrialist. He was a pioneer in establishing the first finance group in Russia and creator of several banks and industrial societies in Sloboda Ukraine. His role in the development of Russian industry was so important that in 1903 the city Alchevsk in Donbas (eastern Ukraine) was named in his honor.

Biography
Born in Sumy, Kharkov Governorate (Sloboda Ukraine) in a family of small grocery merchant held of Sloboda Ukraine cossacks, Alchevsky graduated the Sumy County School and in 1862 moved to Kharkiv. During his young age, he was interested in left populist ideas, poetry of Taras Shevchenko and belonged to Hromada movement. While keeping own tea store, Alchevsky continued self-education.

During the so-called banking fever in Russia at the end of 1860s and beginning of 1870s, Alchevsky became initiator in creating the Kharkov Mutual Society (1866). Later in 1868 as a merchant of the 2nd Guild he became one of the founders of the Kharkov Trade Bank with principal capital of 500,000 rubles becoming the third commerce bank in Russia after the Saint Petersburg Private Commerce Bank and the Moscow Merchant Bank. In 1871 Alchevsky as a merchant of the 1st Guild became one of founders (along with Ivan Vernadsky, a father of Volodymyr Vernadsky) of the first in the country mortgage lending bank, the Kharkov Land Bank with principal capital of 1,000,000 rubles. Alchevsky was a chairman of the bank until his death in 1901.

In 1879 Alchevsky established the Alekseyevskoye Mining Society (principal capital 2,000,000 rubles) that possessed the richest deposits of anthracite coal in Slovianoserbsk county (Yekaterinoslav Governorate). In 1900 the company extracted some 45 million poods of coal becoming the third company in Donbas for coal extraction by volume. Alchevsky also initiated construction of metallurgical factories of the Donets-Yuryevka Metallurgical Society (1895, principal capital 8 million rubles) near train station Yuryevka (today Komunarsk train station in Alchevsk, Alchevsk Metallurgical Complex) and the Russian Providence Society near Mariupol (today part of Illich Steel and Iron Works). By 1900 his fortune was reaching 30 million rubles.

In 1899 along with his wife Khrystyna Zhuravlyova he built the first monument to Taras Shevchenko, however due to the anti-Ukrainian Russian policy the monument-bust was established at a backyard of their personal mansion (built by Alexei Beketov) on Mironosytsky provulok (today Radnarkomivska vulytsia) in Kharkiv. The monument was created out of white marble by the Russian sculptor Vladimir Beklemishev. After the death of Aleksey Alchevsky the mansion was sold out and the fate of the monument is unknown.

During the 1899-1902 economic crisis when he failed to obtain financial help from the Ministry of Finance, on 20 May 1901 Aleksey Alchevsky jumped under a train at the Tsarskoselsky railway station in Saint Petersburg.

Family
Alchevsky was married to an educator and pedagogue Khrystyna Zhuravlyova. They had several children.
 Grigory Alchevsky, a composer 
 Khrystyna Alchevska
 Ivan Alchevsky
 Anna Alchevskaya
 Dmitry Alchevsky, a victim of Red Terror in Crimea
 Nikolay Alchevsky

Legacy
On petition of workers, in 1903 the Yuryevka train station and the workers settlement next to it were renamed into Alchevske (today's city of Alchevsk).

References

External links
 Oleksiy Alchevsky at the Encyclopedia of Ukraine

1835 births
1901 suicides
People from Sumy
People from Sumsky Uyezd
Ukrainian people in the Russian Empire
Hromada (society) members
Philanthropists from the Russian Empire
Bankers from the Russian Empire
Alchevsk
Businesspeople from the Russian Empire
19th-century philanthropists
Suicides by train
Suicides in the Russian Empire